is a Japanese football player for Yokohama FC.

Club statistics
Updated to 1 March 2019.

References

External links
Profile at Yokohama FC

1989 births
Living people
Chuo University alumni
Association football people from Saitama Prefecture
Japanese footballers
J1 League players
J2 League players
Yokohama FC players
Association football midfielders